North Branford High School is a public high school in North Branford, Connecticut. In 2010, North Branford High School had 12 students for every full-time equivalent teacher. It is the only high school in the town of North Branford, which accounts for residents in both North Branford and Northford. The school has around 700 students annually and graduates over 90% of its students.

Administration
In 2006, the administration was accused of grade tampering in order to boost graduation rates. Following an investigation, the state's Attorney General office concluded that no widespread tampering took place.

References

External links
School website

North Branford, Connecticut
Schools in New Haven County, Connecticut
Public high schools in Connecticut